In mathematics, factorization (or factorisation, see English spelling differences) or factoring consists of writing a number or another mathematical object as a product of several factors, usually smaller or simpler objects of the same kind.

Factorization is not usually considered meaningful within number systems possessing division, such as the real or complex numbers, since any  can be trivially written as  whenever  is not zero. However, a meaningful factorization for a rational number or a rational function can be obtained by writing it in lowest terms and separately factoring its numerator and denominator.

Factorization was first considered by ancient Greek mathematicians in the case of integers. They proved the fundamental theorem of arithmetic, which asserts that every positive integer may be factored into a product of prime numbers, which cannot be further factored into integers greater than 1. Moreover, this factorization is unique up to the order of the factors. Although integer factorization is a sort of inverse to multiplication, it is much more difficult algorithmically, a fact which is exploited in the RSA cryptosystem to implement public-key cryptography.

Polynomial factorization has also been studied for centuries. In elementary algebra, factoring a polynomial reduces the problem of finding its roots to finding the roots of the factors. Polynomials with coefficients in the integers or in a field possess the unique factorization property, a version of the fundamental theorem of arithmetic with prime numbers replaced by irreducible polynomials. In particular, a univariate polynomial with complex coefficients admits a unique (up to ordering) factorization into linear polynomials: this is a version of the fundamental theorem of algebra. In this case, the factorization can be done with root-finding algorithms. The case of polynomials with integer coefficients is fundamental for computer algebra. There are efficient computer algorithms for computing (complete) factorizations within the ring of polynomials with rational number coefficients (see factorization of polynomials).

A commutative ring possessing the unique factorization property is called a unique factorization domain. There are number systems, such as certain rings of algebraic integers, which are not unique factorization domains. However, rings of algebraic integers satisfy the weaker property of Dedekind domains: ideals factor uniquely into prime ideals.

Factorization may also refer to more general decompositions of a mathematical object into the product of smaller or simpler objects. For example, every function may be factored into the composition of a surjective function with an injective function. Matrices possess many kinds of matrix factorizations. For example, every matrix has a unique LUP factorization as a product of a lower triangular matrix  with all diagonal entries equal to one, an upper triangular matrix , and a permutation matrix ; this is a matrix formulation of Gaussian elimination.

Integers

By the fundamental theorem of arithmetic, every integer greater than 1 has a unique (up to the order of the factors) factorization into prime numbers, which are those integers which cannot be further factorized into the product of integers greater than one.

In fact, if  is a divisor of  such that , then  is a divisor of  such that .

In principle, it suffices to test only prime divisors. This needs to have a table of prime numbers that may be generated for example with the sieve of Eratosthenes. As the method of factorization does essentially the same work as the sieve of Eratosthenes, it is generally more efficient to test for a divisor only those numbers for which it is not immediately clear whether they are prime or not. Typically, one may proceed by testing 2, 3, 5, and the numbers > 5, whose last digit is 1, 3, 7, 9 and the sum of digits is not a multiple of 3.

This method works well for factoring small integers, but is inefficient for larger integers. For example, Pierre de Fermat was unable to discover that the 6th Fermat number 
 
is not a prime number.

There are more efficient factoring algorithms. However they remain relatively inefficient, as, with the present state of the art, one cannot factorize, even with the more powerful computers, a number of 500 decimal digits that is the product of two randomly chosen prime numbers. This ensures the security of the RSA cryptosystem, which is widely used for secure internet communication.

Example
For factoring  into primes:
Continue with 693, and 2 as a first divisor candidate. 
Continue with 231, and 3 as a first divisor candidate.
 231 is also a multiple of 3: one has , and thus . Continue with 77, and 3 as a first divisor candidate.
 77 is not a multiple of 3, since the sum of its digits is 14, not a multiple of 3. It is also not a multiple of 5 because its last digit is 7. The next odd divisor to be tested is 7. One has , and thus . This shows that 7 is prime (easy to test directly). Continue with 11, and 7 as a first divisor candidate. 
 As , one has finished. Thus 11 is prime, and the prime factorization is 
 .

Expressions
Manipulating expressions is the basis of algebra. Factorization is one of the most important methods for expression manipulation for several reasons. When an expression can be factored, the factors are often much simpler, and may thus offer some insight on the problem. For example,

having 16 multiplications, 4 subtractions and 3 additions, may be factored into the much simpler expression 
 
with only two multiplications and three subtractions. Moreover, the factored form immediately gives roots x = a,b,c as the roots of the polynomial.

On the other hand, factorization is not always possible, and when it is possible, the factors are not always simpler.

Various methods have been developed for finding factorizations; some are described below.

Solving algebraic equations may be viewed as a problem of polynomial factorization. Even though the structure of the factorization is known in these cases, the
s generally cannot be computed in terms of radicals (nth roots), by the Abel–Ruffini theorem. In most cases, the best that can be done is computing approximate values of the roots with a root-finding algorithm.

History of factorization of expressions

The systematic use of algebraic manipulations for simplifying expressions (more specifically equations)) may be dated to 9th century, with al-Khwarizmi's book The Compendious Book on Calculation by Completion and Balancing, which is titled with two such types of manipulation.

However, even for solving quadratic equations, the factoring method was not used before Harriot's work published in 1631, ten years after his death. In his book Artis Analyticae Praxis ad Aequationes Algebraicas Resolvendas, Harriot drew tables for addition, subtraction, multiplication and division of monomials, binomials, and trinomials. Then, in a second section, he set up the equation , and showed that this matches the form of multiplication he had previously provided, giving the factorization  .

General methods
The following methods apply to any expression that is a sum, or that may be transformed into a sum. Therefore, they are most often applied to polynomials, though they also may be applied when the terms of the sum are not monomials, that is, the terms of the sum are a product of variables and constants.

Common factor
It may occur that all terms of a sum are products and that some factors are common to all terms. In this case, the distributive law allows factoring out this common factor. If there are several such common factors, it is preferable to divide out the greatest such common factor. Also, if there are integer coefficients, one may factor out the greatest common divisor of these coefficients.

For example,

since 2 is the greatest common divisor of 6, 8, and 10, and  divides all terms.

Grouping
Grouping terms may allow using other methods for getting a factorization.

For example, to factor 
 
one may remark that the first two terms have a common factor , and the last two terms have the common factor . Thus
 
Then a simple inspection shows the common factor , leading to the factorization 
 

In general, this works for sums of 4 terms that have been obtained as the product of two binomials. Although not frequently, this may work also for more complicated examples.

Adding and subtracting terms
Sometimes, some term grouping reveals part of a recognizable pattern. It is then useful to add and subtract terms to complete the pattern.

A typical use of this is the completing the square method for getting the quadratic formula.

Another example is the factorization of  If one introduces the non-real square root of –1, commonly denoted , then one has a difference of squares

However, one may also want a factorization with real number coefficients. By adding and subtracting  and grouping three terms together, one may recognize the square of a binomial:

Subtracting and adding  also yields the factorization:

These factorizations work not only over the complex numbers, but also over any field, where either –1, 2 or –2 is a square. In a finite field, the product of two non-squares is a square; this implies that the polynomial  which is irreducible over the integers, is reducible modulo every prime number. For example,

since 
since 
since

Recognizable patterns
Many identities provide an equality between a sum and a product. The above methods may be used for letting the sum side of some identity appear in an expression, which may therefore be replaced by a product.

Below are identities whose left-hand sides are commonly used as patterns (this means that the variables  and  that appear in these identities may represent any subexpression of the expression that has to be factorized). 

Difference of two squares

For example,

Sum/difference of two cubes

Difference of two fourth powers

Sum/difference of two th powers
In the following identities, the factors may often be further factorized:
Difference, even exponent

Difference, even or odd exponent

This is an example showing that the factors may be much larger than the sum that is factorized.
Sum, odd exponent

Sum, even exponent
If the exponent is a power of two then the expression cannot, in general, be factorized without introducing complex numbers (if  and  contain complex numbers, this may be not the case). If n has an odd divisor, that is if  with  odd, one may use the preceding formula (in "Sum, odd exponent") applied to 

Trinomials and cubic formulas

Binomial expansions

The binomial theorem supplies patterns that can easily be recognized from the integers that appear in them 
In low degree:

Roots of unity
The th roots of unity are the complex numbers each of which is a root of the polynomial  They are thus the numbers 

for 

For example,

Often one wants a factorization with rational coefficients. Such a factorization involves cyclotomic polynomials. To express rational factorizations of sums and differences or powers, we need a notation for the homogenization of a polynomial: if  its homogenization is the bivariate polynomial  Then, one has

For example, 

since the divisors of 6 are 1, 2, 3, 6, and the divisors of 12 that do not divide 6 are 4 and 12.

Polynomials

For polynomials, factorization is strongly related with the problem of solving algebraic equations. An algebraic equation has the form

A solution of this equation (also called a root of the polynomial) is a value  of  such that

Using the factor theorem recursively, it results that

This complete factorization is unique up to the order of the factors.

In this case, the complete factorization may have some quadratic (degree two) factors. This factorization may easily be deduced from the above complete factorization. So, the product 

Repeating this for all non-real factors gives a factorization with  linear or quadratic real factors.

For computing these real or complex factorizations, one needs the roots of the polynomial, which may not be computed exactly, and only approximated using root-finding algorithms.

In practice, most algebraic equations of interest have integer or rational coefficients, and one may want a factorization with factors of the same kind. The fundamental theorem of arithmetic may be generalized to this case, stating that polynomials with integer or rational coefficients have the unique factorization property. More precisely, every polynomial with rational coefficients may be factorized in a product

Moreover, this factorization is unique up to the order of the factors and the signs of the factors.

There are efficient algorithms for computing this factorization, which are implemented in most computer algebra systems. See Factorization of polynomials. Unfortunately, these algorithms are too complicated to use for paper-and-pencil computations. Besides the heuristics above, only a few methods are suitable for hand computations, which generally work only for polynomials of low degree, with few nonzero coefficients. The main such methods are described in next subsections.

Primitive-part & content factorization

Every polynomial with rational coefficients, may be factorized, in a unique way, as the product of a rational number and a polynomial with integer coefficients, which is primitive (that is, the greatest common divisor of the coefficients is 1), and has a positive leading coefficient (coefficient of the term of the highest degree). For example:

In this factorization, the rational number is called the content, and the primitive polynomial is the primitive part. The computation of this factorization may be done as follows: firstly, reduce all coefficients to a common denominator, for getting the quotient by an integer  of a polynomial with integer coefficients.

This factorization may produce a result that is larger than the original polynomial (typically when there are many coprime denominators), but, even when this is the case, the primitive part is generally easier to manipulate for further factorization.

Using the factor theorem

The factor theorem states that, if  is a root of a polynomial

meaning , then there is a factorization 

where 

Then polynomial long division or synthetic division give:

This may be useful when one knows or can guess a root of the polynomial.

For example, for  one may easily see that the sum of its coefficients is 0, so  is a root. As , and  one has

Rational roots
For polynomials with rational number coefficients, one may search for roots which are rational numbers. Primitive part-content factorization (see above) reduces the problem of searching for rational roots to the case of polynomials with integer coefficients having no non-trivial common divisor.

If  is a rational root of such a polynomial 

the factor theorem shows that one has a factorization

For example, if the polynomial 

That is, one must have 

A direct computation shows that only  is a root, so there can be no other rational root. Applying the factor theorem leads finally to the factorization

Quadratic ac method
The above method may be adapted for quadratic polynomials, leading to the ac method of factorization.

Consider the quadratic polynomial 

with integer coefficients. If it has a rational root, its denominator must divide  evenly and it may be written as a possibly reducible fraction  By Vieta's formulas, the other root  is

with 
Thus the second root is also rational, and Vieta's second formula  gives

that is 

Checking all pairs of integers whose product is  gives the rational roots, if any.

For example, let consider the quadratic polynomial

and the factorization

Using formulas for polynomial roots
Any univariate quadratic polynomial  can be factored using the quadratic formula:

If  are all real, the factors are real if and only if the discriminant  is non-negative. Otherwise, the quadratic polynomial cannot be factorized into non-constant real factors.

The quadratic formula is valid when the coefficients belong to any field of characteristic different from two, and, in particular, for coefficients in a finite field with an odd number of elements.

There are also formulas for roots of cubic and quartic polynomials, which are, in general, too complicated for practical use. The Abel–Ruffini theorem shows that there are no general root formulas in terms of radicals for polynomials of degree five or higher.

Using relations between roots
It may occur that one knows some relationship between the roots of a polynomial and its coefficients. Using this knowledge may help factoring the polynomial and finding its roots. Galois theory is based on a systematic study of the relations between roots and coefficients, that include Vieta's formulas.

Here, we consider the simpler case where two roots 

where  is a polynomial.

It follows that this greatest common divisor is a non constant factor of  Euclidean algorithm for polynomials allows computing this greatest common factor.

For example, if one know or guess that:
 

Unique factorization domains

The integers and the polynomials over a field share the property of unique factorization, that is, every nonzero element may be factored into a product of an invertible element (a unit, ±1 in the case of integers) and a product of irreducible elements (prime numbers, in the case of integers), and this factorization is unique up to rearranging the factors and shifting units among the factors. Integral domains which share this property are called unique factorization domains (UFD).

Greatest common divisors exist in UFDs, and conversely, every integral domain in which greatest common divisors exist is an UFD. Every principal ideal domain is an UFD.

A Euclidean domain is an integral domain on which is defined a Euclidean division similar to that of integers. Every Euclidean domain is a principal ideal domain, and thus a UFD.

In a Euclidean domain, Euclidean division allows defining a Euclidean algorithm for computing greatest common divisors. However this does not imply the existence of a factorization algorithm.

Ideals

In algebraic number theory, the study of Diophantine equations led mathematicians, during 19th century, to introduce generalizations of the integers called algebraic integers. The first ring of algebraic integers that have been considered were Gaussian integers and Eisenstein integers, which share with usual integers the property of being principal ideal domains, and have thus the unique factorization property.

Unfortunately, it soon appeared that most rings of algebraic integers are not principal and do not have unique factorization.

and all these factors are irreducible.

This lack of unique factorization is a major difficulty for solving Diophantine equations. For example, many wrong proofs of Fermat's Last Theorem (probably including Fermat's "truly marvelous proof of this, which this margin is too narrow to contain") were based on the implicit supposition of unique factorization.

This difficulty was resolved by Dedekind, who proved that the rings of algebraic integers have unique factorization of ideals: in these rings, every ideal is a product of prime ideals, and this factorization is unique up the order of the factors. The integral domains that have this unique factorization property are now called Dedekind domains. They have many nice properties that make them fundamental in algebraic number theory.

Matrices

Matrix rings are non-commutative and have no unique factorization: there are, in general, many ways of writing a matrix as a product of matrices. Thus, the factorization problem consists of finding factors of specified types. For example, the LU decomposition gives a matrix as the product of a lower triangular matrix by an upper triangular matrix. As this is not always possible, one generally considers the "LUP decomposition" having a permutation matrix as its third factor.

See Matrix decomposition for the most common types of matrix factorizations.

A logical matrix represents a binary relation, and matrix multiplication corresponds to composition of relations. Decomposition of a relation through factorization serves to profile the nature of the relation, such as a difunctional relation.

See also

Euler's factorization method for integers
Fermat's factorization method for integers
Monoid factorisation
Multiplicative partition
Table of Gaussian integer factorizations

Notes

References

External links

 Wolfram Alpha can factorize too.

Arithmetic
Elementary algebra
Factorization